The Borgia Testament is a 1948 historical novel by the British writer Nigel Balchin. It is written in the form of a journal written by Cesare Borgia shortly before he is due to be executed, recounting his life.

References

Bibliography
 Daniel S. Burt. The Biography Book: A Reader's Guide to Nonfiction, Fictional, and Film Biographies of More Than 500 of the Most Fascinating Individuals of All Time. Greenwood Publishing Group, 2001.

1948 British novels
Novels by Nigel Balchin
British historical novels
Novels set in the 16th century
Novels set in Italy
William Collins, Sons books